Lubango Mukanka Airport  is an airport serving Lubango, the capital city of the Huíla Province in Angola.

Airlines and destinations

Military use
The airport houses four Sukhoi Su-30 fighter aircraft.

Incidents and accidents
 On 8 November 1983 a TAAG Angola Airlines Boeing 737 crashed shortly after takeoff. All 130 passengers and crew on board were killed.

See also
 List of airports in Angola
 Transport in Angola

References

External links
OpenStreetMap - Lubango
OurAirports - Lubango
 
 

Lubango
Buildings and structures in Lubango